Dikembe Dixson (born September 6, 1996) is an American basketball player for Karhu Basket of the Korisliiga. He played college basketball for the UIC Flames.

High school career
Dixson grew up in Freeport, Illinois and was named after Dikembe Mutombo. He attended Paul G. Blazer High School, averaging 19.3 points and 8.1 rebounds per game as a sophomore. He transferred to Thomas Nelson High School but switched to Mingo Central Comprehensive High School in December 2013. As a junior at Mingo Central, he averaged 14.9 points per game and received Division I interest. He played alongside his cousin Montrell Dixson at Mingo Central. He led the team to first berth in the West Virginia Class AA state tournament. Dikembe Dixson was UIC coach Steve McClain's first recruit, picking the Flames after meeting with McClain and hearing how he developed NBA prospects like Victor Oladipo and Cody Zeller as an assistant at Indiana.

College career
As a freshman, Dixson averaged 19.8 points and 7.3 rebounds per game. He was named the Horizon League’s Freshman of the Year in 2016. As a sophomore, Dixson averaged 20.3 points and six rebounds per game while shooting 47.7 percent from the field. He tore his ACL ten games into the season and was forced to miss the remainder of it. Dixson started all 32 games as a junior, averaging 14.2 points, 3.5 rebounds and 1.3 steals per game and shooting 38.9 percent from the field. After the season he declared for the 2018 NBA draft, finishing his career at UIC with 1,250 points.

Professional career

Hoops Club (2018) 
After going undrafted in the 2018 NBA draft, Dixson signed a summer league deal with the Miami Heat. On September 9, 2018, Dixson had signed his first professional contract with Hoops Club in Lebanon. Playing only five games with the team, Dixson had averaged 22.2 points, 4.8 rebounds and 3 steals while shooting 46.7 percent from the field.

Windy City Bulls (2019) 
As of 2019, Dixson had signed a contract with the Windy City Bulls, the G League affiliate team for the Chicago Bulls.

Capital City Go-Go (2019) 
On February 21, 2019, Dixson was traded to the Capital City Go-Go along with a 2019 third-round pick for Tiwian Kendley and 2019 fourth-round pick. He signed an Exhibit 10 deal with the Washington Wizards but was waived on October 17.

Basquete UniFacisa (2019–2020) 
In December 2019, Dixson signed with Basquete UniFacisa of the Novo Basquete Brasil.

Vardar (2021) 
In January 2021, Dixson signed with Vardar of the Macedonian First League. He averaged 19.7 points, 7.3 rebounds, 1.5 assists, and 1.6 steals per game.

T71 Dudelange (2021) 
On July 31, 2021, Dixson signed with T71 Dudelange of the Total League. In eight games, he averaged 25.8 points, 7.4 rebounds, 1.9 assists and 1.5 steals per game.

BBC Monthey-Chablais (2021–2022) 
On November 8, 2021, Dixson signed with BBC Monthey-Chablais of the Swiss Basketball League.

New Basket Brindisi (2022–2023) 
On August 7, 2022, he has signed with New Basket Brindisi of the Lega Basket Serie A.

Karhu Basket (2023–present) 
On February 27, 2023, he signed with Karhu Basket of the Korisliiga.

References

External links
UIC Flames bio

1996 births
Living people
American expatriate basketball people in Brazil
American expatriate basketball people in Lebanon
American expatriate basketball people in Luxembourg
American expatriate basketball people in North Macedonia
American men's basketball players
Basketball players from Illinois
Basketball players from West Virginia
Capital City Go-Go players
Kauhajoen Karhu players
New Basket Brindisi players
People from Freeport, Illinois
People from Matewan, West Virginia
Small forwards
UIC Flames men's basketball players
Windy City Bulls players